Mont Charvin (2,207 m) is a mountain in the Arves Massif in Savoie, France.

Mountains of the Alps
Mountains of Savoie